Woodmar Mall was an indoor shopping mall located at Indianapolis Boulevard between 165th Street and 167th Street in Hammond, Indiana. It opened in 1954 and was anchored by Carson Pirie Scott and Co. The mall was closed and demolished in 2006 except for the Carson's store which remained open until 2018 and which was demolished in 2019. The site is now occupied by the Hammond Sportsplex & Community Center.

History
The Chicago-based developers Landau & Heyman purchased a 20-acre lot in the Woodmar neighborhood of Hammond, Indiana in 1953. They commissioned architect Victor Gruen, who designed the mall as a "v" with a Carson Pirie Scott and Co. store in the center. The shopping center was constructed at a cost of $3 million and opened in early 1954 with eight stores including J.J. Newberry and National Supermarkets. Fourteen additional stores opened on May 19 of that year. The Carson's store was the first one established by the Chicago-based merchant in the state of Indiana and opened on November 1, 1954. In 1964, the Carson's store was expanded from 65,000 sq. ft. to 115,000 with the addition of a third floor. The following year, the mall was enclosed.

After J.J. Newberry left the mall, its former space was subdivided into a 15-store "mini mall" called the "Court of Lions" which opened in September 1975. This generated three times the rent the Newberry's had provided and a combined business volume "between three and four times that of the variety store." The Court of Lions saw its revenues increase by 50% over the course of the next three years. It was modeled after the Court of the Lions in Granada, Spain. A similar mini-mall, the "Court of Turtles" opened in 1977 in the space originally occupied by National Supermarkets. Plans in the early 1980s to add two additional anchor stores were cancelled due to a recession and high interest rates. A renovation of the mall began in 1987 and was completed in 1990.

Long-term competition from the River Oaks Center in Calumet City, Illinois and Southlake Mall in Hobart, Indiana drew business away from Woodmar and led to the mall's decline. By 2004, fewer than a dozen stores remained open. In February 2006, the decision was made to demolish the mall except for the Carson's store. The Hammond Redevelopment Commission announced plans in June 2016 for a $12 million sports complex to be built on the site of the former mall. The Carson's store closed in 2018 as part of its parent company's liquidation. The Hammond Sportsplex & Community Center opened on the site of the former Woodmar Mall in September 2018. Demolition of the former Carson's store began in August 2019.

References

External links
 Woodmar Mall at the Mall Hall of Fame

1954 establishments in Indiana
2006 disestablishments in Indiana
Defunct shopping malls in the United States
Demolished buildings and structures in Indiana
Demolished shopping malls in the United States
Hammond, Indiana
Shopping malls disestablished in 2006
Shopping malls established in 1954
Shopping malls in Indiana
Victor Gruen buildings